Francesco Dall'Olio (born 30 December 1953) is a retired Italian volleyball player. He was part of Italian teams that finished second at the 1978 World Championships and 1975 Mediterranean Games; third at the 1984, eighth at the 1976 and ninth at the 1980 Summer Olympics.

In 1995 he started a new career as a volleyball coach, winning the 1997/98 CEV Champions League with Casa Modena Unibon.

References

1953 births
Living people
Italian men's volleyball players
Italian volleyball coaches
Olympic volleyball players of Italy
Volleyball players at the 1976 Summer Olympics
Volleyball players at the 1980 Summer Olympics
Volleyball players at the 1984 Summer Olympics
Olympic bronze medalists for Italy
Olympic medalists in volleyball
Medalists at the 1984 Summer Olympics
Mediterranean Games silver medalists for Italy
Competitors at the 1975 Mediterranean Games
Mediterranean Games medalists in volleyball